The 1957 Formula One season was the 11th season of FIA Formula One motor racing. It featured the 1957 World Championship of Drivers, which commenced on 13 January 1957 and ended on 8 September after eight races. Juan Manuel Fangio won his fourth consecutive title, his fifth in total, in his final championship. A feat that would not be beaten until Michael Schumacher in 2003. The season also included numerous non-championship races for Formula One cars.



Season summary
Fangio chose to switch teams again, joining Maserati before the start of the season. The decision to switch proved to be a masterstroke, with Ferrari's line-up of Peter Collins, Eugenio Castellotti and the returning Mike Hawthorn failing to win a race. Castellotti and Alfonso de Portago were killed during the season (neither in Formula One crashes), making this a truly disastrous year for Ferrari.

The man Fangio replaced at Maserati, Stirling Moss, moved to Vanwall, a team beginning to fulfill their promise. Between them, Fangio and Moss won every championship race of the season except the Indianapolis 500, with Fangio taking four victories to Moss' three. Fangio's drive at the Nürburgring, where he overtook Collins and Hawthorn on the penultimate lap after a pit stop had put him nearly a minute behind, is regarded as a particularly notable one.

At the end of the year, it was announced Fangio would not return for another season. Maserati also pulled out, citing financial reasons. This was also the final year in which points were awarded for shared drives.

Race 1: Argentina
The first race of the season was in January at the Buenos Aires Autodrome in Argentina's capital city. Briton Moss took pole ahead of Fangio,  Behra, and Ferrari drivers Castellotti, Collins, Musso, and Hawthorn. At the start of the race, Behra took the lead from Fangio and Castellotti. Moss was taken by surprise, and a juddering start damaged the throttle mechanism, and he pitted at the end of the first lap. While Moss sat in the pits, Castellotti led but was then overtaken by Behra. Soon afterwards, Collins worked his way to the front, but within a few laps, he was in trouble with his clutch and had to pit. This left Behra in the lead again, but Fangio soon passed him. Castelotti had lost his third position after a spin, so now Hawthorn was leading the charge, although both he and Musso would retire after a while with clutch problems. Castellotti remained the only challenge to the Maseratis at the front, but his race ended when a wheel fell off with 24 laps to go. Menditeguy and Schell were promoted to third and fourth when Castellotti went out, so Maserati started the season by romping home with a 1-2-3-4 result, with Fangio winning his 4th Argentine Grand Prix in a row ahead of Behra.

Argentina '57 would be Castellotti's last Grand Prix. He was killed testing a Ferrari at the Modena Aerodrome in March. A non-championship race was held in Syracuse on the southern Italian island of Sicily; Peter Collins won this race for Ferrari. The Pau Grand Prix, held on the city streets of the southwestern French town of Pau, was won by home favourite Behra in a Maserati, while on the same day, the Glover Trophy at the Goodwood circuit in southern England was won by Briton Stuart Lewis-Evans in a Connaught-Alta. Six days after these two events, Collins won the Naples Grand Prix. Another works Ferrari driver, Spaniard Alfonso de Portago, was killed in May while contesting the Mille Miglia sportscar race in Italy for Ferrari.

Race 2: Monaco
Four months after the Argentine round and several non-championship races, the teams assembled in Monaco for the second championship round of the season. Moss had joined Vanwall from Maserati, driving a car designed by Colin Chapman and financed by Tony Vandervell, a wealthy British industrialist, leaving Fangio as the undisputed team leader at Maserati. Fangio took pole position. However, Moss took the lead at the first corner with Fangio behind him, but on the second lap, Collins got ahead of the Argentine driver. Moss went off and crashed at the chicane on lap 4, and Collins swerved to avoid the crash and ended up hitting a stone wall. Fangio managed to get through without a problem, and Brooks braked hard only to be rammed from behind by Hawthorn. Only Brooks could keep going, but he was five seconds behind Fangio by the time he was up to speed again. Von Trips was third, with Menditeguy fourth and Schell fifth. Menditeguy would have to stop early for new tyres after hitting a curb, so Schell moved to fourth until his suspension broke. Brabham was next in the little Cooper with Trintignant chasing him, but the Frenchman soon dropped away with a stop to cure a misfire. After several retirements, Australian Jack Brabham was up to third, but a fuel pump failure left him to push the car to the line. He was classified sixth, and Fangio won again ahead of Brooks, Masten Gregory in a Maserati, Lewis-Evans, and Trintignant.

Race 4: France
The Indianapolis 500 was the 3rd round of the championship, but since that race was not run to Formula One rules, no competitors who raced in Formula One raced at the Indy 500, and vice versa. The Belgian and Dutch Grands Prix, scheduled for 2 and 16 June, were both cancelled because of disputes over money affected by the Suez crisis in Egypt. This resulted in a six-week break between Monaco and the French GP, which was to be held at the Rouen-Les-Essarts public road circuit in northern France, extended from its previous layout used in 1952.

In practice, Fangio was fastest, with Behra and Musso alongside on the front row. Behind them were Schell and Collins, with the third row consisting of Salvadori, Hawthorn, and Trintignant. Behra went into the lead at the start, but Musso soon got ahead. Fangio followed in third, with Collins and Schell giving chase. Then came a fast-starting McKay-Fraser. Fangio worked his way past Behra on the second lap and took Musso for the lead on lap four. BRM suffered a setback when Flockhart seriously damaged his car in a high-speed accident, although he himself was not hurt. Collins worked his way past Behra, and the order remained unchanged at the front all the way to the flag, with Fangio winning from Musso and Collins. Behra slipped behind Hawthorn, allowing the Englishman to give the Lancia-Ferraris a 2-3-4 finish behind Fangio. McKay-Fraser's promising run ended with a transmission failure at one-third distance, but the American would not be seen again in Formula 1. He was to die a few days later in the annual Formula 2 race at the Reims public road circuit before the Reims Grand Prix, which Musso won in a Lancia-Ferrari.

Race 5: Britain
The British Grand Prix was held at the Aintree circuit in Liverpool instead of at the Silverstone circuit between London and Birmingham the previous year. The Aintree circuit was located in the middle of the horse-racing course where the famous Grand National was held. Both Vanwall drivers missed the French Grand Prix and were back in action for their home race. This was to be a landmark race for British motorsports. At the start of the race, Behra took off into the lead with Moss in hot pursuit, and the Englishman emerged ahead at the end of the lap, to the delight of the partisan crowd. Brooks was third, with Hawthorn fourth and Collins fifth. There were four British drivers in the top five positions. Then came Schell, Musso, and Fangio. Moss was able to build up his lead, but the car began to sound rough, and he pitted. Behra took the lead with Brooks behind him, but the second Vanwall driver was soon called into the pits to give his car to Moss, who re-joined in ninth position. He began to work his way through the field. Behra remained ahead, with Hawthorn unable to challenge him. Then came Lewis-Evans and Collins. Moss was quickly back up to fifth. The field was thinned out by a series of mechanical failures, including Fangio and Collins. Moss caught Lewis-Evans, but on lap 69, the whole race changed when Behra's clutch exploded. Hawthorn ran over some of the wreckage and suffered a puncture. Lewis-Evans took the lead but was passed almost immediately by Moss. The dream of a Vanwall 1–2 was punctured when Lewis-Evans suffered a broken throttle linkage which dropped him to seventh place. Moss duly won the race, claiming the first World Championship victory for a British car. Musso was second, with Hawthorn third.

The Caen Grand Prix, another important non-championship Formula One race held in the town of Caen in northern France (further west of Rouen), held between the British and German Grands Prix, was won by Behra in a BRM.

Race 6: Germany
At the Nürburgring in Germany, the field was as expected, with Lancia-Ferrari fielding Mike Hawthorn, Peter Collins, and Luigi Musso and Maserati running Juan Manuel Fangio, Jean Behra, and Harry Schell in their leading cars. The field was bolstered for the first time by Formula 2 machinery, which included a trio of Porsches and various Cooper-Climaxes; the length of the circuit allowed for these cars to run alongside each other.

Pole position went to Fangio, with Hawthorn, Behra, and Collins completing the front row. Then came Brooks, Schell, and Moss. At the start, Hawthorn and Collins went into a battle for the lead, with Fangio and Behra giving chase. On the third lap, Fangio passed Collins and soon took the lead. Collins then passed Hawthorn and chased after Fangio, but the Argentine driver was edging gradually away. A slow mid-race pit stop lasting 1 minute and 18 seconds (originally supposed to be 30 seconds) dropped Fangio one minute behind the two Lancia-Ferraris, but he chased back hard, broke the lap record ten times, and passed first Collins and then Hawthorn on the penultimate lap. Fangio thus won the race and his fifth World title.

Race 7: Pescara

The cancellation of the Belgian and Dutch Grands Prix earlier in the season enabled the FIA to include the Coppa Acerbo Pescara Grand Prix in the World Championship for the first time, although it had been contested since 1924. It was held during the 1930s Grand Prix days of Mercedes, Auto Union, and Alfa Romeo and continued as a non-championship race throughout the 1950s. The  public road circuit, the longest ever used for a Formula One race (even longer than the Nürburgring), was very dangerous. Practice was limited, and Enzo Ferrari did not bother to send cars for Mike Hawthorn and Peter Collins, partly because the World Championship had already been won by Juan Manuel Fangio and partly in protest against the Italian government's moves to ban road racing following Alfonso de Portago's accident earlier in the year in the Mille Miglia. Luigi Musso managed to convince Ferrari to lend him a car and entered the race as a privateer.

Maserati's Fangio set the fastest time in qualifying, with Stirling Moss second in his Vanwall. Musso was third. The second row of the 3-2-3 grid featured the Maseratis of Jean Behra and Harry Schell, while row three had Vanwall's Tony Brooks and Stuart Lewis-Evans split by the Scuderia Centro Sud Maserati of Masten Gregory.

The weather was hot,  at the start, Musso took the lead. Maserati privateer Horace Gould hit a mechanic who was slow to get off the grid. Vanwall's challenge was blunted when Brooks retired with mechanical troubles on the first lap. Moss took the lead from Musso on lap two, but the two cars remained together. Fangio ran third, but the field thinned out quickly as the hot temperatures took their toll, with Lewis-Evans losing nearly a lap because of two tyre failures and Behra suffering an engine failure. On lap 10, Musso disappeared when his engine blew, the oil causing Fangio to have a spin which damaged one of his wheels. By the time Fangio re-joined, Moss was un-catchable. Moss's lead was even able to stop for a drink and to have his oil topped up, and he won the race ahead of Fangio. Schell finished third, with Gregory fourth and Lewis-Evans grabbing fifth at the end of the race from the fourth Maserati factory driver Giorgio Scarlatti. The Coppa Acerbo was never again used for a Formula One championship race; the race was last held in 1961 as a sportscar race.

Race 8: Italy
The Italian Grand Prix at Monza was held only on the road circuit without the poorly constructed concrete banking this year, as it had caused problems for the Italian constructors the year before. The track was very like the Monza of today, although without the chicanes. Ferrari was back in action for this most important of Italian races after boycotting Pescara. So it was a three-way fight between the Lancia-Ferraris, the Maseratis, and the Vanwalls. The British cars were strong, with pole position going to Stuart Lewis-Evans with Stirling Moss and Tony Brooks alongside him. Juan Manuel Fangio put his Maserati on the outside of the 4-3-4 grid while his teammates Jean Behra and Harry Schell shared row two with Peter Collins's Lancia-Ferrari. There were three more cars on row three with Wolfgang von Trips, Luigi Musso, and Mike Hawthorn alongside the Scuderia Centro Sud Maserati of Masten Gregory.

Although the Vanwalls went away from the grid at the front, Behra moved up to second on the first lap. Fangio attached himself to the train of cars ahead of him, and the five began to pull away from the rest of the field while indulging in a traditional Monza slipstreaming battle which saw the lead constantly changing between Moss and Behra. On lap seven, Fangio took the lead, but he was soon toppled in favour of Moss, Brooks, and then Lewis-Evans. On lap 20, Brooks dropped out of the fight with a sticking throttle. Then Lewis-Evans ran into trouble and pitted. This left Moss in the lead with Fangio and Behra behind him, although Behra would pit soon afterwards for new tyres. This moved Schell into third place, but he disappeared with an oil leak which meant that third was passed on to Collins. At two-thirds distance, Collins ran into engine trouble and pitted. This promoted Hawthorn to third, but a split fuel pipe dropped him to sixth in the closing laps, leaving third place to Von Trips.

Season conclusion
Three more non-championship races were held, all of which were won by Jean Behra. The BRDC International Trophy at Silverstone in England, Jean Behra won driving a BRM; the Modena Grand Prix at the Modena Aerodrome (where Eugenio Castellotti had been killed previously) and the Moroccan Grand Prix at the Ain-Diab public road circuit in Casablanca, both won in a Maserati.

All seven FIA-mandated championship races had been won by two drivers in 1957: Argentine Juan Manuel Fangio and Briton Stirling Moss. Although Moss took over an ill Tony Brooks's car during the British Grand Prix, he won with it on the road at that event.

Season review
The 1957 World Championship of Drivers comprised the following eight races.

All Grand Prix races were run for Formula One cars, while the Indianapolis 500 was run for USAC National Championship cars and also counted towards the 1957 USAC Championship. The ongoing Suez crisis, which affected oil tankers delivering oil to their respective countries, affected several countries, such as the Netherlands, Belgium, and Spain. These countries were to each have Grands Prix, but they were all cancelled because of the very high oil prices in those countries.

Teams and drivers

The following teams and drivers competed in the 1957 World Championship of Drivers. The list does not include those who only contested the Indianapolis 500.

 Pink background denotes F2 entrants to the German Grand Prix

World Championship of Drivers standings

Championship points were awarded on an 8–6–4–3–2 basis for the first five placings in each race. An additional point was awarded for the fastest race lap.

 Italics indicate the fastest lap (1 point awarded – point shared equally between drivers sharing fastest lap)
 Bold indicates pole position
 † Position shared between more drivers of the same car
 ‡ Too few laps driven to receive points
 Only the best five results counted towards the championship. Numbers without parentheses are championship points; numbers in parentheses are total points scored.
1 – Ineligible for Formula One points because he drove a Formula Two car.

Non-championship races
The following Formula One races, also held in 1957, did not count towards the World Championship of Drivers.

Notes and references

External links
 1957 World Championship images at www.f1-photo.com

Formula One seasons